Shajahanum Pareekuttiyum is a 2016 Indian Malayalam-language romantic comedy drama film directed by Boban Samuel. The film stars Kunchacko Boban, Jayasurya and Amala Paul in the lead roles. Nikki Galrani made a cameo appearance. Principal photography began on 4 April 2016, and the film released on 6 July 2016 on the occasion of Eid.

Synopsis
Jiya, suffers from a short term memory loss after an accident. Although Jiya's marriage is fixed with Major Ravi, she has flashes of memory that she had been in a relationship with a certain Mr. P. However, she doesn't know who this mysterious guy is. So, the task of finding Mr. P is entrusted with Mathews. But making his job easier and difficult at the same time, two people come into the scene, Pranav is a high profile businessman and Prince is a local goon, claiming to be Jiya's boyfriend and what happens rest forms the crux of the story. At the end it's revealed that Pranav has been tailed Jiya to get back Pranav's favourite car, a red modified Toyota Celica T200 Car. At last it's revealed that when Jiya take the car it met with an accident and she is saved by none other than Prince. And now, Pranav's car is with Prince. When a fight for the car occurred, when Prince accidentally beat the car's rear fender with a crowbar, it's revealed that the car's inner body (inside car's paint layer) is painted with Illegal Gold, because the car actually belong to Pranav's boss, a gold smuggler, and the car is Pranav's boss' son's memory. At the end Pranav and Prince escape with the car and Pranav's boss is caught by the police. And the both got remuneration from Customs for catching Pranav's boss.

Cast 

Kunchacko Boban as Pranav
Jayasurya as Prince    
Amala Paul as Jiya
Rafi as Joseph, the main antagonist
Aju Varghese as Major Ravi, Jiya's fiancé
Lena Kumar as Dr. Deepa
Suraj Venjaramoodu as Detective Mathews
Vijayaraghavan as Colonel Stephen, Jiya's father
Vinaya Prasad as Reena, Jiya's mother
Nadirshah as Psychiatrist Titus Alex (cameo appearance)
Nikki Galrani as Thresiamma Punnose (cameo appearance)
Irshad Ali as Sameer
Lishoy as Devanarayanan
Kalabhavan Shajon as Ashokan
Kunchan as Kunjappan
Kochu Preman as Purushothaman
Baiju Ezhupunna as Tony
Sunil Sukhada as Father Andrews
Shaju K.S. as Jackson
Nandu Poduval as Ravindran, Mental Patient
Asottan Bombay
Prithviraj Sukumaran as himself
Nivin Pauly as himself
Chiranjeevi as himself

Production
Y. V. Rajesh, whose previous venture as a writer with Boban Samuel was the 2013 hit comedy film Romans, wrote the script for the film in early 2016 and tied up with friend and frequent collaborator, Boban Samuel. The film started rolling in early April with Kunchacko Boban and Jayasurya as the lead actors and Amala Paul as the female lead.

It is the seventh film in which K Boban and Jayasurya have acted together, with their most recent one being the 2016 thriller drama School Bus. Samuel has previously directed K Boban in the film Romans. On May 25, it was reported that Nikki Galrani would essay a role of a customs officer in the film. In June 2016, it was revealed that Aju Varghese would play the role of a military man. The character would be inspired by Malayalam director Major Ravi.

Release 
Shajahanum Pareekuttiyum released during the festival of Eid on 6 July 2016. In the box office, it pitted against Karinkunnam 6'S.

References

External links
 

2016 films
2010s Malayalam-language films
Films directed by Boban Samuel